Bergerac is a British crime drama television series. Set in Jersey, it ran from 18 October 1981 to 26 December 1991. Produced by the BBC in association with the Australian Seven Network, and first screened on BBC1, it stars John Nettles as the title character Jim Bergerac, who is initially a detective sergeant in Le Bureau des Étrangers ("The Foreigners' Office", a fictional department dealing with non-Jersey residents), within the States of Jersey Police, but later leaves the force and becomes a private investigator.

Westward Studios executive producer Brian Constantine said the Bergerac reboot was in the final stages of development, possibly airing 2024.

Background
The series ran from 1981 to 1991. It was created by producer Robert Banks Stewart after an earlier detective series, Shoestring, starring Trevor Eve, came to an abrupt end. Like Shoestring, the series begins with a man returning to work after a particularly bad period in his life: Eddie Shoestring from a nervous breakdown; Jim Bergerac from alcoholism and from a crushed and badly-broken leg.

Bergerac sometimes deals with controversial topics; for example, when an old man is unmasked as a Nazi war criminal, his age raised various moral dilemmas. Supernatural elements occasionally appear in the series, and some episodes end with unpleasant twists, as in "Offshore Trades" and "A Hole In The Bucket".

The final episode filmed was the 1991 Christmas Special titled "All for Love", set partly in Bath. The final scene provides a strong hint about Bergerac's future, after Charlie Hungerford recommends Bergerac for a new position heading an expanded Bureau des Étrangers covering the whole of the Channel Islands following its success in Jersey.

The show is repeated on channels such as Alibi and Drama. On 24 February 2014, the BBC started a rerun of the series on daytime afternoons on BBC Two. The repeats concluded with series 3 to avoid showing the Haut de la Garenne location.

Episodes

Cast

Main
John Nettles as Detective Sergeant Jim Bergerac (Series 1-9)
Terence Alexander as Charlie Hungerford (Series 1-9)
Sean Arnold as Chief Inspector/Superintendent Barney Crozier (Series 1-8)
Cécile Paoli as Francine Leland (Series 1)
Deborah Grant as Deborah Bergerac (Series 1-9)
Annette Badland as Charlotte (Series 1-3)
Celia Imrie as Marianne Bellshade (Series 2)
Louise Jameson as Susan Young (Series 4-8)
Thérèse Liotard as Danielle Aubry (Series 8-9)

Supporting
Mela White as Diamante Lil (Series 1-5)
Lindsay Heath as Kim Bergerac (Series 1-5)
Geoffrey Leesley as Detective Constable Terry Wilson (Series 1-5)
Tony Melody as the Chief (Series 1-3)
Jonathan Adams as Dr. LeJeune (Series 1-3)
Liza Goddard as Philippa Vale (Series 3-7)
Nancy Mansfield as Peggy Masters (Series 4-7)
Jolyon Baker as DC Barry Goddard (Series 4-5)
John Telfer as DC Willy Pettit (Series 6-9)
Ben Kershaw as DC Ben Lomas (Series 6-9)

Lead character and casting
Jim Bergerac is a complex character, presented by the series as a somewhat unorthodox police officer. He is recovering from alcoholism, partly resulting from an unpleasant divorce.

A Jersey native, he returns to the island at the start of the series after recuperating in England from ill health, dipsomania and major surgery on his leg following an accident caused by his drinking heavily prior to an attempted arrest. The accident is shown in episode two as a flashback: Bergerac was swigging brandy during a surveillance when he noticed his suspect and gave chase. He attempted to prevent the man's escape by leaping onto his boat. Under the influence of his drinking, he slipped back and his left leg was crushed against the harbour wall by the boat.

As a result of this accident, Bergerac begins episode one deemed unfit to serve, but he seeks to remain on the police force.  While his status is being considered, he is key to solving a case with old colleagues in the recently formed "Bureau des Étrangers"; he is then posted to that unit and does well. By the end of the series, Bergerac has become a private detective.

As an aspect of his unorthodox behaviour, Bergerac drives a burgundy 1947 Triumph Roadster instead of an approved police vehicle.

According to a 2001 interview with Robert Banks Stewart, John Nettles was cast on his insistence. He said, "A programme like that would never get made today without having a household name, but back then I fought to have John Nettles play Bergerac because he was right for it."

Romance 
Bergerac's relationships with women are a frequent theme, often as a subplot to the main crime investigation. Bergerac's girlfriends include Francine Leland (Cécile Paoli) (who had been the fiancée of a dead colleague), Marianne Bellshade (Celia Imrie), Susan Young (Louise Jameson) and Danielle Aubry (Thérèse Liotard). He has several encounters with ex-wife Deborah (Deborah Grant), who has custody of their daughter Kim (Lindsay Heath).

Other characters
The main supporting character was Jim Bergerac's former father-in-law Charlie Hungerford (played by Terence Alexander). Charlie was a lovable rogue and would-be tycoon often involved in shady dealings, but paradoxically something of an innocent. Bergerac usually had a good relationship with him, although in the first episode, "Picking It Up", they were not on the best of terms. Charlie was involved in all but two of the 87 episodes.

Other regular characters in the series included Bergerac's ex-wife, Deborah (Deborah Grant), and his boss, Superintendent Barney Crozier (Sean Arnold), initially an inspector (promoted from sergeant immediately before the first episode) and later chief inspector. Bergerac had several sidekicks who were generally detective constables.

Bergerac had an ongoing flirtatious relationship with glamorous jewel thief Philippa Vale (Liza Goddard), who went by the nickname of the Ice Maiden (Series 3: "Ice Maiden", Series 4: "Return of the Ice Maiden", Series 5: "SPARTA", and Series 7: "Old Acquaintance").

Many well-known actors had guest roles in Bergerac, either before or after rising to fame. These include Philip Glenister, Julian Glover, Connie Booth, Ray Winstone, Prunella Scales, Louise Lombard, Ronald Pickup, Norman Wisdom, Charles Gray, John Forgeham, Bernard Hepton, Bill Nighy, and Steve McFadden.

Locations
The series played heavily on its Jersey location. The early storylines were usually in and around Jersey with short scenes shot in England and France. In later episodes the action strayed further away from Jersey and was increasingly based in France.

As Jersey is a small island, most of the filming locations there can be tracked down with ease. Jim Bergerac and Susan Young's flat was located just above St Aubin, a few doors along from the Somerville Hotel; part of the interior was shot within another flat at Gorey, six miles away.  Jim's original home in the first few series was submerged when the States of Jersey flooded the valley to create the Queen's Valley reservoir in 1991. Plans for this reservoir were referred to at the start of series four, when Bergerac was forced to seek new accommodation because of them, in the process meeting an estate agent who became his lover.

One of the main locations of the series achieved later notoriety. The Bureau des Étrangers from the third season onwards was located at Haut de la Garenne, a former children's home which in February 2008 became the focus of the Jersey child abuse investigation 2008.  The building, on Mont de la Garenne overlooking Mont Orgueil and the Royal Bay of Grouville, ceased being a children's home in 1983 (before the series started filming there) and was re-opened as Jersey's first and only youth hostel.

The original Bureau in the TV series was located in St Helier's Royal Square, but filming there became difficult after the first series as the pretence of filming a documentary series was spoilt by public recognition of Bergerac's Triumph.

Windward House, Le Mont Sohier, St Brelade (built in 1924, since demolished c.2010) with lush grounds overlooking Ouaisné and St Brelade's Bay, was a stunning location used internally and externally throughout all nine series and the Christmas specials. This pink-and-grey building with white pillared entrance first appeared in series 1, episode 6, "Portrait of Yesterday", as the home and wedding venue of the incidental characters. Windward House then reappeared from series 2, episode 1, as Charlie Hungerford's main residence, where he hosted a large garden fête, and then in almost every episode of the show—used either as part of the central plot or as a backdrop for family gatherings, drinks parties, business meetings, barbecues, marquee events, etc. The entire house was used over time, particularly the living room with French windows, dining room, conservatory and long gallery hallways. External filming regularly included the gardens, paddock, driveways, fruit gardens, greenhouse, cider press and rockery.

Noirmont Manor, Noirmont, was Charlie Hungerford's home throughout series one.

As the series ran for a decade, directors found it increasingly difficult to find locations which had not been overused. While promoting his film White Noise in an interview with Xpose magazine, director Geoffrey Sax described how he made an effort to find new locations, only to return for the actual shoot to find camera tripod marks in the ground, another director having shot there in the meantime. They became tourist attractions, with signs advertising "Visit Bergerac's Location" or "See Bergerac's Car".

Plot lines occasionally took the action onto the British mainland, particularly London, and Richmond Riverside figured prominently.

Home media
Bergerac was made available on DVD by 2 Entertain / Cinema Club. The first series was released on 8 May 2006, including audio commentaries on three episodes.

Mistakes occurred in the supply of the source material for the DVD releases, which meant the episodes of Series 1 and 6 were edited versions broadcast originally on UK daytime television.  This was amended for Bergerac: The Complete Collection, a 27-DVD box set released in 2009 which includes all episodes in their full length.

In June 2021, the first two series became available on BritBox and series 3 to series 9 with all the Christmas special episodes became available in October 2021.

As of September 2021, seasons 1,2,3,5,6,7,8,9 were available to stream in the United States via Amazon Prime with a BritBox subscription.

Theme music 
The Bergerac theme music, composed by George Fenton, featured a reggae and accordion refrain. In 1982, he won a BAFTA 'Best Original Television Music' award for the music. In 2018 a DJ known as Youngr re-recorded the track, entitled Bergerac Remastered, with a video shot in locations around Jersey.

See also

 The Detectives, a BBC comedy series, one episode of which features John Nettles's last performance to date as Jim Bergerac.
 Will Smith Presents the Tao of Bergerac, a radio comedy series based on an obsessive fan of Bergerac
 The Cult of Bergerac, a 30 minute 2008 BBC4 documentary, featuring many cast members and writer Robert Banks Stewart

References

External links
 Bergerac on the BBC
 
 
 

1981 British television series debuts
1991 British television series endings
1980s British crime drama television series
1980s British mystery television series
1980s British police procedural television series
1980s British workplace drama television series
1990s British crime drama television series
1990s British mystery television series
BBC crime drama television shows
BBC mystery television shows
British detective television series
Jersey in fiction
English-language television shows
Fictional British police detectives
Television series by BBC Studios
Television shows set in the British Isles